Tubular fluid is the fluid in the tubules of the kidney. It starts as a renal ultrafiltrate in the glomerulus, changes composition through the nephron, and ends up as urine leaving through the ureters.

Composition table
The composition of tubular fluid changes throughout the nephron, from the proximal tubule to the collecting duct and then as it exits the body, from the ureter.

References

Kidney
Urology